Eugene Rowell is a former member, albeit briefly, of the Chicago Bears during the 1987 NFL season. He played at the collegiate level at the University of Dubuque.

Rowell was star athlete at Dubuque, reaching to the 1979 NCAA Heavyweight championship in wrestling, and receiving Division III Football All-American honors in the same year. He was also named First-team All-Iowa Conference in 1978 and 1979, while the Spartans won three Iowa Intercollegiate Athletic Conference Championships (1978-1980).

Rowell signed as a undrafted free-agent with the Seattle Seahawks but got injured during training camp and subsequently released by the team. He spent the next two years rehabbing, before signing with the Chicago Bears in 1985. Rowell got cut from the team after training camp in 85' and 86', before eventually making the team in 1987, as replacement player.

References

People from Fennimore, Wisconsin
Players of American football from San Diego
Players of American football from Wisconsin
Seattle Seahawks players
Chicago Bears players
Dubuque Spartans football players
American football defensive tackles
National Football League replacement players
1958 births
Living people